Chalepus bicolor is a species of leaf beetle in the family Chrysomelidae. It is found in the Caribbean Sea and North America.

References

Further reading

External links

 

Cassidinae
Articles created by Qbugbot
Beetles described in 1792